Cochamarca (from Quechua Qucha Marka or Quchamarka, meaning "lake village") is one of six districts of the  Oyón Province in Peru.

Geography 
Other mountains are listed below:

References